The eighth season of the Bleach anime series is named the . The episodes are directed by Noriyuki Abe, and produced by TV Tokyo, Dentsu and Studio Pierrot. The season adapts Tite Kubo's Bleach manga series from the 29th volume to the 32nd volume (chapters 252–286). The episodes' plot centers on Ichigo Kurosaki's and his friends' battle against the Espada, the strongest members of former Soul Reaper captain Sōsuke Aizen's army, to save Orihime Inoue.

The season aired from December 12, 2007, to April 16, 2008. The English adaptation of the Bleach anime is licensed by Viz Media, and the season aired from September 26 to November 21, 2009, on Cartoon Network's Adult Swim. Four DVD compilations, each containing four episodes of the season, were released by Aniplex between May 28 and August 27, 2008. Viz Media released the season in two separate DVD boxes during 2011 on June 21 and September 6. The first box, however, also contains episodes from the previous season.

The episodes use three pieces of theme music: one opening theme and two closing themes. The opening theme is "After Dark" by Asian Kung-Fu Generation. To promote the second Bleach featured film, Bleach: The DiamondDust Rebellion, the opening and closing credits for episode 152 to 154 use footage from the film, which was released on December 22, 2007.



Episode list

References
General

Specific

2007 Japanese television seasons
2008 Japanese television seasons
Season 08